135th may refer to:

135th (2/1st South Western) Brigade, formation of the Territorial Force of the British Army
135th (Limerick) Regiment of Foot, infantry regiment of the British Army, created and promptly disbanded in 1796
135th (Middlesex) Battalion, CEF, unit in the Canadian Expeditionary Force during the First World War
135th Aero Squadron or 22d Tactical Drone Squadron, inactive United States Air Force unit
135th Airlift Group, airlift unit located at Warfield Air National Guard Base in Middle River, Maryland
135th Airlift Squadron, one of two flying units of the Maryland Air National Guard
135th Delaware General Assembly, meeting of the legislative branch of the Delaware states government
135th Georgia General Assembly succeeded the 134th and served as the precedent for the 136th General Assembly in 1981
135th Illinois Volunteer Infantry Regiment, infantry regiment that served in the Union Army during the American Civil War
135th Infantry Regiment (United States), infantry regiment in the Army National Guard
135th Kentucky Derby or 2009 Kentucky Derby
135th meridian east, line of longitude across the Arctic Ocean, Asia, the Pacific Ocean, Australasia, the Indian Ocean, the Southern Ocean and Antarctica
135th meridian west, line of longitude across the Arctic Ocean, North America, the Pacific Ocean, the Southern Ocean and Antarctica
135th Ohio Infantry (or 135th OVI) was an infantry regiment in the Union Army during the American Civil War
135th Quartermaster Company or 87th Combat Sustainment Support Battalion (United States)
135th Street (IND Eighth Avenue Line), local station on the IND Eighth Avenue Line of the New York City Subway
135th Street (IRT Lenox Avenue Line), station on the IRT Lenox Avenue Line of the New York City Subway
135th Street (IRT Ninth Avenue Line), station on the demolished IRT Ninth Avenue Line
135th Street (Manhattan), New York
135th Sustainment Command (Expeditionary), subordinate unit of the 167th Theater Sustainment Command and the Alabama Army National Guard
2d Battalion, 135th Aviation Regiment (United States), Army helicopter battalion which deployed to Iraq
Connecticut's 135th assembly district elects one member of the Connecticut House of Representatives
Pennsylvania's 135th Representative District or Pennsylvania House of Representatives, District 135

See also
135 (number)
AD 135, the year 135 (CXXXV) of the Julian calendar
135 BC